The Czech Mixed Doubles Curling Championship is the national championship of mixed doubles curling (one man and one woman) in the Czech Republic. It has been held annually since the 2008–2009 season and organised by the Czech Curling Association.

List of champions and medallists
Team line-ups shows in order: woman, man, coach (if exists).

Medal record for curlers

References

See also
Czech Men's Curling Championship
Czech Women's Curling Championship
Czech Mixed Curling Championship
Czech Junior Curling Championships